Robert of Burgundy may refer to:
Robert II of France, duke of Burgundy (1004–16)
Robert I, Duke of Burgundy (r. 1032–76)
Robert of Burgundy (died 1113), regent of Sicily
Robert of Burgundy (bishop of Langres) (1087–1111)
Robert of Autun, bishop (1122–40)
Robert II, Duke of Burgundy (r. 1272–1306)
Robert of Burgundy (died 1317)
Robert, Count of Tonnerre (1302–1334)

See also
Dukes of Burgundy family tree